Adam Brown (born 29 May 1980) is an English actor and comedian. He is best known for playing the dwarf Ori in Peter Jackson's Hobbit trilogy and Cremble in Pirates of the Caribbean: Dead Men Tell No Tales.

Life and stage career
He studied at the John O'Gaunt Community Technology College in his birthplace, Hungerford, Berkshire. Following his time at John O'Gaunt, he trained in Performing Arts at Middlesex University, London, where he met Clare Plested and helped co-found the British comedy theatre troupe Plested and Brown. He wrote and performed in all seven of their shows: Carol Smillie Trashed my Room, The Reconditioned Wife Show, Flamingo Flamingo Flamingo, Hot Pursuit, Minor Spectacular, Health & Stacey and The Perfect Wife Roadshow. A regular at the Edinburgh Festival he toured with his company across the UK as well as performances in Armenia, South Korea and New Zealand. With the rest of the Plested and Brown team (Amanda Wilsher and Clare Plested) he has worked with David Sant (Peepolykus), Phelim McDermott (Improbable), Cal McCrystal (The Mighty Boosh) and Toby Wilsher (ex-Trestle).

Film and television career

Brown plays the dwarf Ori in the film series based on J. R. R. Tolkien's The Hobbit. The films marked his first film appearance. Commenting on Brown's casting, director Peter Jackson was quoted as saying, "Adam is a wonderfully expressive actor and has a unique screen presence. I look forward to seeing him bring Ori to life."

Personal life
Brown is openly gay and lives in Brighton.

Stage work

Filmography

Television

Film

Video games

References

External links
 

1980 births
Living people
Alumni of Middlesex University
English male film actors
English male stage actors
English gay actors
People from Hungerford
British mimes
English LGBT actors
20th-century English LGBT people
21st-century English male actors
21st-century English LGBT people